Aware Super is an Australian superannuation fund headquartered in Sydney, New South Wales. With $150bn under management and over 1 million members, it is Australia's third-largest superannuation fund.

History

It was initially established in 1992 as First State Super to provide superannuation benefits to New South Wales government employees. First State Super became a public offer fund on 1 May 2006, opening up membership to anyone eligible to receive superannuation benefits. This was in response to feedback from existing members who were keen to remain with the fund when they changed jobs and moved from the public to the private sector. The change meant First State Super became included in comparisons of performance, fees and other features with other funds.

In 2012, First State Super merged with Health Super, a not‐for‐profit superannuation fund for workers in the health and community services sector. At the time the merger meant the combined entity was the third largest superannuation fund in Australia.

In 2016, First State Super acquired StatePlus for $1.1bn to boost its advice offering. The asset has since under-performed, losing nearly $400m and been affected by a fee-for-no-service scandal which prompted an ASIC referral.

On 1 July 2020, First State Super and VicSuper merged to become Aware Super. Shortly after rebranding as Aware Super in 2020, it undertook a mass divestment that reduced the carbon footprint of its holdings in equities by 40%. On 3 December 2020, WA Super merged with Aware Super.

Current Ratings and Awards

2020 – Chant West Finalist: Super Fund of the Year, Pension Fund of the Year, Best Fund for Insurance, Best Fund for Investments, Best Fund for Advice Services
2020 – MySuper of the Year Finalist (SuperRatings)
2020 – Best New Innovation of the Year Finalist (SuperRatings)
2020 – SuperRatings Platinum rating for Employer Sponsored, Personal and Income Stream
2020 – Chant West 5 Apples super rating; 5 Apples pension rating

Controversy
In September/October 2011, a security vulnerability in First State Super's system was discovered by a customer.  First State Super received considerable negative publicity nationally and internationally, both for the severity of and ease of compromise of the exploit, and also for the actions and public relations that occurred in the aftermath of the notification.

The Federal Privacy Commissioner investigated the event. On 7 June 2012, the Privacy Commissioner found that at the time of the incident, First State Super was in breach of National Privacy Principal 4.1. As a result of First State Super and Pillar's immediate action, the Commissioner ceased the investigation and closed his file on the matter on the basis that the response to the incident was adequate in the circumstances.

See also
Superannuation in Australia
Australian Retirement Trust
AustralianSuper
UniSuper
Hostplus
Vanguard Super

References

External links 
 Aware Super – Official website

Superannuation funds in Australia
Financial services companies established in 1991
1991 establishments in Australia